Gustave Anicet Bebbe Mbangue (born 22 June 1982) is a Cameroonian professional footballer who plays for Turkish club Gebzespor. He is a winger, but also plays at forward.

Club career
Bebbe was born in Yaoundé, Cameroon.

In November 2011, Bebbe signed to play with reigning Vietnamese champions Sông Lam Nghệ An of the V-League.

International career
Bebbe also has Turkish citizenship under the name M. Alper Aydın, however, he lost his eligibility to play for Turkey when he was capped for Cameroon in June 2008.

References

External links

Living people
1982 births
Association football forwards
Association football wingers
Cameroonian footballers
Cameroon international footballers
Footballers at the 2008 Summer Olympics
Olympic footballers of Cameroon
Coton Sport FC de Garoua players
Diyarbakırspor footballers
Konyaspor footballers
MKE Ankaragücü footballers
İstanbul Başakşehir F.K. players
Kasımpaşa S.K. footballers
Süper Lig players
Song Lam Nghe An FC players
Expatriate footballers in Turkey
Turkish people of Cameroonian descent
Naturalized citizens of Turkey